A list of synagogues in Mexico:

Nidjei Israel, a historical synagogue in Mexico City
Yehuda Halevi Synagogue
Agudas Ajim
Adat Israel
Monte Sinaí
Rodfei Tzedek
Beth Moshe
Shar le Simja
Beth Yosef
Hoel Yitzjak
Beth Yitzjak
Or Joseph
Habitat
Maguén David
Aram Zoba
Maor Abraham
Maor Hatora
Keter Tora
Birkat Shmuel
Ramat Shalom
Shaarei Tzion
Bet El
Beth Israel Community Center
Shul Yavne Bnei Akiva
Comunidad Hebrea de Guadalajara
Comunidad Israelita de Guadalajara
Comunidad Judia de Cancun
Jewish Cultural & Community Center San Miguel de Allende
Chabad of San Miguel de Allende
Chabad of Cozumel Mexico
Chabad of CDMX
Chabad of Playa del Carmen
Chabad of Isla Mujeres
Chabad of Guadalajara
Chabad of Cancun
Chabad of Tijuana
Chabad of Los Cabos

References 

Synagogues
Mexico